Petra Steger (born 4 October 1987) is an Austrian politician and member of the National Council for the Freedom Party of Austria (FPÖ). She is also a former professional basketball player.

She was educated at the Vienna University of Economics and Business. She is the daughter of former FPÖ leader and Vice-Chancellor of Austria Norbert Steger.

References

1987 births
Living people
Sportspeople from Vienna
Politicians from Vienna
Austrian women's basketball players
Vienna University of Economics and Business alumni
Members of the National Council (Austria)
Freedom Party of Austria politicians
21st-century Austrian women politicians
21st-century Austrian politicians